Wang Yizhu (1925 – 18 June 2019) was a Chinese translator and scholar. Wang masters Chinese, classical Greek, Latin, English, French, German, Japanese, Russian, Spanish and Hebrew. In the Chinese academic society, he was accounted as the only scholar who has the ability to talk with Qian Zhongshu in different languages.

Biography
Wang was born in a wealthy family in Tianjin in 1925. During his childhood, Wang lived in Tianjin concession, he learned English and French by himself.

Wang was a graduate student in English language at the Peking University, he stayed at home learned Japanese, German and Italian by himself about seven years.

During the Chinese Civil War, Wang taught at Tianjin Nankai School.

After the founding of the Communist State, Wang worked in the People's Literature Publishing House.

In 1966, the Cultural Revolution was launched by Mao Zedong, Wang was sent to the May Seventh Cadre Schools to work in Xianning.

Translations
 Histories
 Annals
 The History of War
 History of the Ancient Oriental
 History of the Ancient Roman



 Collected Works of Goethe and Schiller (Johann Wolfgang von Goethe and Johann Christoph Friedrich von Schiller)
 Tsurezuregusa (Yoshida Kenko)
 Poetry of Wilde (Oscar Wilde)

Awards
 Chinese Translation Association – Competent Translator (2004)

Personal life
Wang married translator Cui Miaoying, she was a graduate student in English language at the Fu Jen Catholic University, she masters English, French and German.

References

1925 births
2019 deaths
Writers from Tianjin
National University of Peking alumni
People's Republic of China translators
English–Chinese translators
French–Chinese translators
German–Chinese translators
Japanese–Chinese translators
Russian–Chinese translators
20th-century Chinese translators
21st-century Chinese translators
Translators of Johann Wolfgang von Goethe